Bishopp is a surname. Notable people with the surname include:

Bishopp baronets
Thomas Bishopp (disambiguation)